RJ Rohith is an Indian actor and Radio Jockey who works in Kannada-language films and television.

Career 
Rohith is a radio jockey who voiced the shows such as "Take it Easy" and "Big Nayaka" on BIG FM 92.7. He was a contestant on the second season of Bigg Boss Kannada and worked as a host for the television show Divided. After playing a supporting role in Bombay Mittai, he made his lead film debut with Karvva in which he portrayed one of the lead roles. The film was a success upon release. In addition to starring in the film, Rohith also co-wrote the film. He went on to play the lead role in Buckasura (2018) with director Navaneeth, whom he worked with in Karvva.

Filmography 
All films are in Kannada.

Television

References

External links 

Living people
Indian radio presenters
Male actors in Kannada cinema
Television personalities from Karnataka
Year of birth missing (living people)